Chatto & Windus is an imprint of Penguin Random House that was formerly an independent book publishing company founded in London in 1855 by John Camden Hotten. Following Hotten's death, the firm would reorganize under the names of his business partner Andrew Chatto and poet William Edward Windus. The company was purchased by Random House in 1987 and is now a sub-imprint of Vintage Books within the Penguin UK division.

History
The firm developed out of the publishing business of John Camden Hotten, founded in 1855. After his death in 1873, it was sold to Hotten's junior partner Andrew Chatto (1841–1913), who took on the poet William Edward Windus (1827–1910), son of the patron of J. M. W. Turner, Benjamin Godfrey Windus (1790–1867), as partner. Chatto & Windus published Mark Twain, W. S. Gilbert, Wilkie Collins, H. G. Wells, Wyndham Lewis, Richard Aldington, Frederick Rolfe (as Fr. Rolfe), Aldous Huxley, Samuel Beckett, the "unfinished" novel Weir of Hermiston (1896) by Robert Louis Stevenson, and the first translation into English of Marcel Proust's novel À la recherche du temps perdu (Remembrance of Things Past, C. K. Scott-Moncrieff, 1922), among others.

In 1946, the company took over the running of the Hogarth Press, founded in 1917 by Leonard and Virginia Woolf. Active as an independent publishing house until 1969, when it merged with Jonathan Cape, it published broadly in the field of literature, including novels and poetry. It is not connected, except in the loosest historical fashion, with Pickering & Chatto Publishers.

Chatto & Windus became a limited company in 1953. Norah Smallwood was appointed to the board, and later succeeded Ian Parsons as chairman and managing director in 1975, serving until her retirement in 1982.

Chatto, along with Jonathan Cape and Virago Press were purchased by Penguin Random House in 1987. As of 2019, Chatto & Windus is an imprint of Vintage Publishing UK.

Book series

 Chatto Curiosities of the British Street
 Dolphin Books
 Golden Library
 Landmark Library 
 New Medieval Library, AKA Medieval Library 
 The New Phoenix Library 
 The Phoenix Library
 The Phoenix Living Poets
 St Martin's Library 
 Zodiac Books

References

Further reading
Warner, Oliver, Chatto & Windus: A Brief Account of the Firm's Origin, History and Development, London: Chatto & Windus, 1973.
Knowlson, James, Damned to Fame: The Life of Samuel Beckett, New York: Simon & Schuster, 1996.
Sutherland, John, The Stanford Companion to Victorian Fiction, Stanford University Press: 1990, p. 118.

External links

Chatto & Windus catalogs

Archives of Chatto & Windus Ltd

Book publishing companies of the United Kingdom
Random House
Publishing companies established in 1855
British companies established in 1855
Chatto family